{{Infobox monarch
| name =Andragoras
| title =
| image= AndragorasCoinHistoryofIran.jpg
| image_size=300px
| caption = Gold coin of Andragoras.Obv:Bearded ruler wearing the tiara.Rev: Greek legend ΑΝΔΡΑΓΟΡΟΥ ("of Andragoras"). Quadriga driven by Nike, together with an armed warrior.
| reign = 245–238 BC
| succession = Ruler of Parthia and Hyrcania
| religion =
| coronation =
| full name =
| predecessor =
| successor = Arsaces I
| spouse  = 
| issue = 
| royal house =
| father =
| mother = 
| birth_date = 
| birth_place = 
| death_date = 238 BC
| death_place = Parthia
| date of burial = 
| place of burial =
}}
Not to be mistaken for Andragoras, a satrap of Alexander from 331 BC, also in the area of Parthia.Andragoras''' (died 238 BC) was an Iranian satrap of the Seleucid provinces of Parthia and Hyrcania under the Seleucid rulers Antiochus I Soter and Antiochus II Theos. He later revolted against his overlords, ruling independently from 245 BC till his death.

Biography

The background of Andragoras is obscure. His name may have been a Greek translation of the Old Persian Narisanka and Avestan nairya-sanha- (one of the messengers of Ahura Mazda). A Greek inscription from Hyrcania (Gurgan) written before 266 BC makes mention of a certain Andragoras of lesser status who was presumably the same person before he was appointed satrap. The name of Andragoras is uncommon, and the only other reportage of the name is in the Greek papyri from Ptolemaic Egypt, thus the identification of the two is not far-fetched. Andragoras was later appointed governor of the frontier province of Parthia, which had been merged with the neighboring province of Hyrcania since the conquest of the Achaemenid Empire by the Macedonian ruler Alexander the Great in 330 BC. 

Parthia was during this period constantly receiving new waves of Iranian migrants from Central Asia, most notably the Parni led by Arsaces I. Around 245 BC, Andragoras proclaimed his independence from the Seleucid monarch Seleucus II Callinicus, and made his governorate an independent kingdom. Following the secession of Parthia and Hyrcania from the Seleucid Empire and the resultant loss of Seleucid military support, Andragoras had difficulty in maintaining his borders, and about 238 BC—under the command of Arsaces I, the Parni invaded Parthia and seized control of Astabene (Astawa) from Andragoras, the northern region of that territory, the administrative capital of which was Kuchan. A short while later the Parni seized the rest of Parthia from Andragoras, killing him in the process. Hyrcania was shortly conquered by the Parni as well.

References

 Bibliography 
 Ancient works 
Justin, Epitome of the Philippic History of Pompeius Trogus.
Ammianus Marcellinus, Res Gestae.
Strabo, Geographica''.

Modern works 
 
 
 
 
 
 
 
 
 
 
 
 
 
 
 
 

Seleucid satraps
238 BC deaths
Year of birth unknown
3rd-century BC Iranian people